The Main road 354 is a short bypass direction First class main road near Debrecen, that connects the Main road 4, near Hajdúhadház to the Debrecen-észak junction in M35 motorway.

The road, as well as all other main roads in Hungary, is managed and maintained by Magyar Közút, state owned company.

See also

 Roads in Hungary

Sources

External links
 Hungarian Public Road Non-Profit Ltd. (Magyar Közút Nonprofit Zrt.)
 National Infrastructure Developer Ltd.

Main roads in Hungary
Hajdú-Bihar County